Ramidi  is a village in the Kapurthala district of Punjab State, India. The village is administered by a Sarpanch who is an elected representative of village as per the constitution of India and Panchayati raj. It is the biggest village in the surrounding area. It has various facilities such as a bank, government high school, paved roads, street lights, government water tank, various dairies, general grocery stores, dispensary, and gurdwara (Sikh temple) Sant Sar Sahib.

Some famous Kabaddi players from Ramidi are Beera, Nirbhay Bal, Sarwan Singh Bal, Bagha Bal, Tarsem Bal, Sukha Bal, Tejpal Bal, Kindu Bal, Sona Bal and at present Johal Bal. Many people from Ramidi have settled in Canada, USA, England, Europe, Australia and New Zealand. 

There are three gurdwaras in the village. One is in Dadu Ki Patti, one is in Jetha Patti, and one gurdwara called Sant Sar Sahib is located close to the main rail track (Jalandhar Amritsar).  
All above actively participated in the Indian farmers' protest (world's largest protest ever) held at the borders of Delhi in December 2020.

Demography 
According to the report published by Census India in 2011, Ramidi has a total number of 418 houses and a population of 1,949, which includes 996 males and 953 females. The literacy rate of Ramidi is 78.50%, higher than the state average of 75.84%. The population of children under the age of 6 years is 172, which is 8.83% of the total population of Ramidi, and the child sex ratio is approximately 933, higher than the state average of 846.

Population data

References

External links
  Villages in Kapurthala
 Kapurthala Villages List

Villages in Kapurthala district